The FIBA Oceania Championship for Men 1979 was the qualifying tournament of FIBA Oceania for the 1980 Summer Olympics. Australia won the series 3–0 to win its fourth consecutive Oceania Championship.

Teams that did not enter

Results

References
FIBA Archive

FIBA Oceania Championship
Championship
1979 in New Zealand basketball
1979 in Australian basketball
International basketball competitions hosted by Australia
Australia men's national basketball team games
New Zealand men's national basketball team games
Basketball in New South Wales